Cliddesden railway station was a railway station in the village of Cliddesden, Hampshire, UK. The station was a stop on the Basingstoke and Alton Light Railway until its closure in 1932.

History
When built, a wind engine was provided to supply the station buildings and cottages. It was made by John Wallis Titt. The wind engine outlasted the railway, surviving until the 1940s. The station was used for the filming of 1937 film Oh, Mr Porter! which features Cliddesden as the fictional Buggleskelly.

Route

Sources

References

Disused railway stations in Hampshire
Former London and South Western Railway stations
Railway stations in Great Britain opened in 1901
Railway stations in Great Britain closed in 1917
Railway stations in Great Britain opened in 1924
Railway stations in Great Britain closed in 1936